Juraynah جرينة  is a town in the Madaba Governorate of north-western Jordan.

It is located to the north of Madaba, about five kilometers from the governorate center, and about twenty-six kilometers south of Amman. Administratively, it is affiliated to the Greater Madaba municipality, and to the Juraynah district of the Madaba governorate. Juraynah is the northern gateway to Madaba Governorate from Amman.

History and memory of the place 
The name of the town has not changed over the years, and this name is taken from the word "juran" "جرن", which is the rocky expanse of water in the rocks, as if the village, in its low location between the neighboring villages, was shaped like a water jar, and the name was reduced to green, and then it was feminized with time, perhaps to endearment in the place, so it became The name "Jurayn" "جرين", and it became known to this village to distinguish it from villages similar to it, because its name became associated with the clan (Shawabkeh) that inhabited the village here in the eighteenth century, and then its name was known as Jurenet Alshawabkeh "جرينة الشوابكة", and after an actual and tangible move took place in it. The framework of the agricultural sector in it, and this was observed in the agricultural activity, and reflected greenery, fruits, and farmers throughout the area of the place, the people of the village began to call them among themselves the name of Junaynah which mean garden instead of Juraynah.

With this simplicity, the elders of the village talk about Junaynah, the interpretation of the meaning of the name, the simplification of its connotations related to the interpretation of an incubator of water, and a comfortable connotation of the place between the surrounding heights, and therefore we did not go into much detail in the semantics of the interpretation and were satisfied with what we extracted from the words of the people of the village.

Geography: village boundaries and Terrain 
An overview of the geography of the place, its ancient and modern borders, and it reconciled between what the people of the village told me and the reality of the situation throughout the area of Juraynah, where they spoke explaining that the village, in its cadastral division, consists of four basins: the eastern basin of Juraynah, the western basin of Juraynah, and the basin of Abu an-Naml. And the Abu Ardaina Basin, while its old borders were as follows: from the north, Ardi Hisban, from the south, Al-Khattabiah (formerly Kfir Abu Sarbut) and Al-Faisaliah, and from the east, the village of Manga, and from the west, Burnt and Jamal (Dead Sea)

As for the new borders, which are after the expansion of the Amman Municipality, and the annexation of Hisban lands to it, the change of borders took place on the northern side of Juraynah, as it became bordered on the north by the borders of the Amman Municipality, and the people of the village referred to it as a boundary (the German Jordanian University and the Al-Mashqar Agricultural Station), and from the west. Granada and El-Arish, and from the south, Madaba, and from the east, Manga and the Capital Governorate.

Juraynah Al Shawabkeh - Juraynah

According to the geographical description of Juraynah, it is famous for its fertile lands, excellent climate, and summer cultivation, which those who see it believe are irrigated, and what distinguishes the village is the cultivation of fruit trees such as grapes, figs and pomegranates, and it also contains water springs such as Ain Jamala, Ain Abu Al Asas, Ain Salma, and Ain Al Baida.

Also, there are old water wells in the village of Juraynah, which are scattered in many parts of the village, and one of those wells has been observed neglected and buried in the yard of a house, and by going back to the Madaba land settlement files, it will be noticed that there were about 79 water wells in Juraynah. The elders of the village pointed out that the most famous of those wells, which is still well established in memory, is Bir Zagh, and it has disappeared, was buried, and with it many of these wells have healed in the recent period.

This area that the adults refer to, and which is famous for its caves, contains valuable antiquities in the same basin, including the remains of a church located in the Al-Barrak area in the Abu Ardaina Basin.

houses and mosques 

Upon entering into the internal structure of forming the village, the memory tends in the adults to reveal that the first house built in its Juraynah is the house of Sheikh Darweesh Suleiman Al-diabat Al-Shawabkeh, and the house of Sheikh Suleiman Daibes Al-Shawabkeh, and their homes were built of rough stone, and then the homes of the rest of the people of his village were built, and they were built according to Everyone's ability to build, but most of them were of mud, dirt and straw, and some of them treated it with plaster and plaster, and there was reliance on the arches system, and those who built these stone houses were Druze builders, and the roof of the houses was of mud and reed.

As for the village mosque, the villagers say that it was built in the fifties, and the people of the village used to pray in the same place, but without there being an existing building. Several modern mosques were built, namely, the People of Good Mosque in the Eastern Quarter, and the Al-Abrar Mosque in the Southern District.

Education 
As for education in Juraynah, it has a story that deserves to be shed light on, as it began in the pre-public school stage, and there is a memory for writers, preachers, and sheikhs. Salama Al-Khatib and Yassin Abu Al-Khail Al-Shawabkeh took over the task after him, and the latter was performing, in addition to teaching, the mission of the mosque's imam and the mosque preacher.

There are three schools in the village: Juraynah Comprehensive Secondary School for Boys, and these include an Agricultural School in it, Juraynah Secondary School for Girls, and Juraynah Elementary Mixed School. There are also two private schools, Hateen Private School, and Hittin Private Kindergarten, and on the border between the Amman Municipality and the Madaba municipality, and within the boundaries of the Juraynah region is the German-Jordanian University.

Health 
There is a health center, and a primary care health center.

Civil society 
The town has the Shawabkeh Villages Charitable Association, the Quran Memorization Association, and the Juraynah Model Youth Center.

There are seven mosques in the town.

Juraynah features 

 An increase in the number of educated people in the region, especially in the scientific fields (engineering and medicine).
 The abundance of fertile lands and plain lands.
 The dependence of the people on the agricultural sector in general.
 The town is near the administrative borders of the capital, Amman.
 The town is near the German-Jordanian University.

References

External links

Populated places in Amman Governorate